Presidential elections were held in Cyprus on 14 February 1988, with a second round on 21 February. They were the first presidential elections in the country's history to go to a second round, and resulted in a victory for George Vassiliou as an independent candidate supported by AKEL after he finished as the runner-up behind Glafcos Clerides of the Democratic Rally in the first round. Voter turnout was 94.3% in both rounds.

Results

References

1988 in Cyprus
Cyprus
Presidential elections in Cyprus
February 1988 events in Europe